Sherman R. Sobocinski (1927 - November 16, 2011) was a former member of the Wisconsin State Assembly.

Biography
Sobocinski was born on January 12, 1927, in Cudahy, Wisconsin. During World War II, he served in the United States Navy. He is a member of the Society of the Holy Name. Sobocinski was a hydraulic lift operator, warehouse clerk, and an assistant field manager. He died on November 16, 2011. Sobocinski was a Roman Catholic.

Political career
Sobocinski was elected to the Assembly in 1956 and served until 1963. He was a Democrat.

References

External links
The Political Graveyard

People from Cudahy, Wisconsin
Catholics from Wisconsin
Democratic Party members of the Wisconsin State Assembly
Military personnel from Wisconsin
United States Navy sailors
United States Navy personnel of World War II
1927 births
2011 deaths
American politicians of Polish descent